Marcos Roberto Silveira Reis (born 4 August 1973), known as Marcos, is a Brazilian former professional footballer who played as a goalkeeper. He spent his entire professional career at Palmeiras, of the Série A, from 1992 until his retirement in January 2012, and became one of the club's greatest idols, being nicknamed São Marcos ("Saint Mark" in Portuguese). He was the starting goalkeeper of the champion Brazilian squad of the 2002 FIFA World Cup. He is regarded by pundits as one of the greatest Brazilian goalkeepers of all time.

Club career

He played for Brazilian professional club Palmeiras since 1992 and was the first goalkeeper since 1999 after an injury of Velloso, the first-choice goalkeeper at the time. With outstanding performances in the 1999 Copa Libertadores he helped the team conquer the title, after beating Palmeiras' arch rivals Corinthians in the penalty shoot-outs in the quarter-final. Since then he was nicknamed São Marcos. In 2000 once again he faced Corinthians in the Libertadores, this time at the semi-final level, and again eliminated the rivals in the penalty shoot-out.

In 2002, after a fantastic World Cup participation with Brazil's team, he received a proposal from the English team Arsenal and actually went to London to sign but then disappeared, leaving Arsenal midfielder and fellow Brazilian, Edu, wondering where he had gone, therefore the deal never happened. When he eventually surfaced, he stated that he would rather play the Campeonato Brasileiro Série B (second division) with Palmeiras than play in any European team just for the money.

In 2008, he helped Palmeiras win the 2008 Campeonato Paulista. Marcos played his 400th match for Palmeiras on 21 September 2008 in a Campeonato Brasileiro Série A match between his club and Vasco.

He was given a special shirt for playing his 400th match. The number 400 was printed on the back, with his name and the writings "O melhor goleiro do Brasil" (The best goalkeeper in Brazil). On the front, all the titles that he has won along with Palmeiras and Brazil's national team are printed.

On 4 January 2012, at the age of 38, Marcos announced his retirement from football, due to his advanced age and the many injuries that marked his career.

Marcos is one of the greatest idols of Palmeiras' fans, alongside Ademir da Guia and Djalma Santos.

International career
Marcos debuted for Brazil in a match against Spain on 13 November 1999. Previously, he was included in Brazil's squad for the 1999 Copa América and the 1999 FIFA Confederations Cup as a second-choice goalkeeper. He remained as Brazil's backup goalkeeper as Dida and Rogério Ceni were preferred ahead of him. He became Brazil's starting goalkeeper in the 2001 Copa América and retained that position after the tournament, relegating Dida to the bench.

He was subsequently included in Brazil's squad for 2002 FIFA World Cup as the first-choice goalkeeper, replacing Taffarel. He started every game in the tournament and played every minute of Brazil's matches in the tournament. He had four clean sheets, conceded only four goals in seven matches, and helped Brazil win the World Cup for a record fifth time. Simon Kuper and Stefan Szymanski reported in their book Soccernomics that Marcos spent the entire tournament in severe pain from a prior broken wrist injury that did not properly heal, unable to train fully or even catch the ball in some matches. According to Marcos' agent, Marcos hid the injury from manager Luiz Felipe Scolari through the tournament.

However, after a series of injuries that affected his career, Marcos lost his place in the team after the World Cup. He made only four more international appearances after the World Cup, and was left out of Brazil's squad for the 2003 FIFA Confederations Cup and the 2004 Copa América. In 2005, he was called again and included in the squad for the 2005 FIFA Confederations Cup. He made one appearance in the tournament, starting in a 2–2 draw against Japan during the group stage, which turned out to be his last appearance for Brazil.

On 6 October 2005, Marcos announced his retirement from international football, but continued to play for Palmeiras, the only team he has played for in his career.

However he would later go back on his decision to retire from the national team, and announced himself as still available for callups. He was placed on standby lists for the 2006 FIFA World Cup and the 2007 Copa América, but did not manage to get a place in the final list of neither competitions. Marcos got specially upset with missing the World Cup in Germany, as he was still recovering from an injury.

Style of play
While writing for Sports Illustrated in 2009, Tim Vickery described Marcos with the following words: "Tall, athletic, commanding, good under pressure," while also praising him for his longevity. Nicknamed São Marcos ("Saint Mark" in Portuguese), he was also known for his penalty–stopping abilities, and is regarded by pundits as one of the greatest Brazilian goalkeepers of all time.

Career statistics

Club

International

Honours
Palmeiras
Campeonato Brasileiro Série A: 1993, 1994
Campeonato Paulista: 1993, 1994, 1996, 2008
Torneio Rio – São Paulo: 1993, 2000
Copa do Brasil: 1998
Copa Mercosur: 1998
Copa Libertadores: 1999
Brazilian Champions Cup: 2000
Campeonato Brasileiro Série B: 2003

Brazil U20
South American U-20 Championship: 1992

Brazil
Copa América: 1999
FIFA World Cup: 2002
FIFA Confederations Cup: 2005

Individual
Copa Libertadores Most Valuable Player: 1999
Copa Libertadores Best Goalkeeper: 1999
Copa Libertadores Final Most Valuable Player: 1999
Copa Libertadores Best Newcomer: 1999
Campeonato Paulista Best Goalkeeper: 1999, 2003, 2008
Copa Mercosur Best Goalkeeper: 1999
Torneio Rio – São Paulo Best Goalkeeper: 2000
Best Latin American Goalkeeper: 1999, 2002
IFFHS World's Best Goalkeeper fourth place: 2002
Campeonato Brasileiro Série B Most Valuable Player: 2003
Campeonato Brasileiro Série A Goalkeeper of the Year: 2008, 2009

References

External links

Palmeiras official profile 

No Dia do Goleiro, PLACAR escolhe os dez 'paredões' do futebol brasileiro – Placar 

1973 births
Living people
Footballers from São Paulo (state)
Brazilian footballers
Brazil international footballers
Association football goalkeepers
Sociedade Esportiva Palmeiras players
Campeonato Brasileiro Série A players
1999 Copa América players
1999 FIFA Confederations Cup players
2001 Copa América players
2002 FIFA World Cup players
2005 FIFA Confederations Cup players
Copa América-winning players
Copa Libertadores-winning players
FIFA Confederations Cup-winning players
FIFA World Cup-winning players